Luke Short (born Frederick Dilley Glidden November 19, 1908 – August 18, 1975) was a popular Western writer. At least nine of his novels were made into films.

Biography
Born in Kewanee, Illinois, he attended the University of Illinois at Urbana-Champaign for two and a half years and then transferred to the University of Missouri at Columbia to study journalism.  Following graduation in 1930, he worked for a number of newspapers before becoming a trapper in Canada. He later moved to New Mexico to be an archeologist's assistant.
After reading Western pulp magazines and trying to escape unemployment, he began to write Western fiction. He sold his first short story and novel in 1935 under the pen name of Luke Short (which was also the name of a famous gunslinger in the Old West, although it's unclear if he was aware of that when he assumed the pen name.) His apprenticeship in the pulps was comparatively brief. In 1938, he sold a short story, "The Warning", to Collier's, and in 1941, he sold his novel Blood on the Moon, or Gunman's Chance, to The Saturday Evening Post. Some of his later novels were also serialised in the Post.

After publishing over a dozen novels in the 1930s, he started writing for movies in the 1940s.  In 1948 alone, four Luke Short novels appeared as movies. Among his notable film credits are Ramrod (1947) and Blood on the Moon (1948). His novel, The Whip, or Doom Cliff, was serialized in both Collier's and The Saturday Evening Post. The first two parts were published in Collier's in the December 21, 1956, and January 4, 1957 issues.  Collier's then ceased publication. The Saturday Evening Post bought the rights to the remaining unpublished installment and published it on February 9, 1957. Short continued to write novels, despite increasing trouble with his vision, until his death in 1975. His ashes are buried in Aspen, Colorado, his home at the time of his death.

He married Florence Elder in 1934 and the couple had three children.

Novels

The Feud at Single Shot, 1935
The Branded Man, 1936
The Man on the Blue, 1936
Marauders' Moon, 1937
King Colt, 1937
Brand of Empire, 1937
Bold Rider, 1938
Savage Range, 1938
Raiders of the Rimrock, 1938
Hard Money, 1938
Bounty Guns, 1939
War on the Cimarron, 1939
Dead Freight for Piute, 1939 - Albuquerque (film), 1948 
Bought with a Gun, 1940
Barren Land Showdown, 1940
Raw Land, 1940
Gunman's Chance, 1941 — Blood on the Moon (film), 1948
Hardcase, 1941.  Dave Coyle is a runt, a trouble-maker, a prankster, and a cold-blooded killer - so they say.  But he risks his life to buffalo a town and stop a ranch-taking because a girl was once kind.
Ride the Man Down, 1942 - Ride the Man Down (film), 1952
Sunset Graze, 1942
And the Wind Blows Free, 1943—told in the first person—unique for Short
Ramrod, 1943 — Ramrod (film), 1947
Coroner Creek, 1945 — Coroner Creek (film), 1948
Fiddlefoot, 1946
Station West, 1946 — [[Station West|Station West (film)]], 1948.  Cavalry officer John Haven must work undercover and alone in prize fights and sawmills to find who stole Army uniforms to then rob a gold bullion shipment.High Vermilion, 1948 - filmed as Silver City, 1951Vengeance Valley, 1949 — Vengeance Valley, 1951Ambush, 1948 — Ambush (film), 1950Play a Lone Hand, 1950Barren Land Murders, 1951Saddle by Starlight, 1952Silver Rock, 1953 - Hell's Outpost (film), 1954Rimrock, 1955The Whip, 1956Summer of the Smoke, 1958First Claim, 1960Desert Crossing, 1961Last Hunt, 1962The Some-Day Country, 1963First Campaign, 1965Paper Sheriff, 1965.  A sheriff discovers the Hoad clan's new scheme is rustling and murder.  He embarks on a one-man feud with the clan - and his wife, a former Hoad in the thick. The Primrose Try, 1966Debt of Honor, 1967The Guns of Hanging Lake, 1968Donovan's Gun, 1968The Deserters, 1969Three for the Money, 1970Man from the Desert, 1971The Outrider, 1972The Stalkers, 1973The Man from Two Rivers, 1974Trouble Country, 1976

Short-story collectionsLuke Short's Best of the West, 1983, includes 12 short stories - "Pull Your Freight!" (The Hangman, 1959 movie), "Gunslick Gold",  "Lead Won’t Lie",  "The Warning", "Bounty Hunter", "The Doctor Keeps a Promise", "High Grade", "Florida Manets West",  "Court Day", "Payoff at Rain Peak",  "Rough Shod", and "Top Hand."The Marshal of Vengeance'', 1986, includes six short stories - "The Marshal of Vengeance", "The Ghost Deputy of Doubletree", "Death Cold-Decks a Tinhorn", "War Fires Light the Stage Trails", "Hideout", and "Exile".

References

External links

Guide to the Frederick D. Glidden papers at the University of Oregon

People from Kewanee, Illinois
Western (genre) writers
20th-century American novelists
American male novelists
Novelists from Illinois
Place of death missing
1908 births
1975 deaths
American male short story writers
20th-century American short story writers
20th-century American male writers